Wesleyan Society may refer to:

 Wesleyan Assurance Society
 Wesleyan Philosophical Society
 Fundamental Wesleyan Society

See also
 Wesley Historical Society